The Academy of Christian Humanism University (UAHC) is a Chilean non-profit private university, founded in 1988 but whose origins date back to 1975 when establishing the Academy of Christian Humanism, led by Cardinal Raúl Silva Henríquez (SDB), whose purpose was to bring together a group of intellectuals to discuss the politics, society, economy and culture of Chile.

This university, also known simply as La Academia (The Academy) is accredited in the areas of Institutional Management and Undergraduate Studies by the National Commission on Accreditation, an organization that ensures the quality of higher education in Chile, for a period of 3 years from December 2008 and December 2011. It, along with the Andrés Bello and Diego Portales University was awarded research funds from the National Fund for Scientific and Technological Development (FONDECYT) program's regular contest of 2009.

The University now offers 21 courses leading to diploma and degree graduates, special programs and 9 master's programs in the areas of Social Sciences, Education, Arts and Culture, State, Economy and Management, and also a PhD in Education with twenty years of experience.

History 
The university began in 1975 when Cardinal Raúl Silva Henríquez (SDB) prompted the establishment of the Academy of Christian Humanism, a center for studies in a framework of freedom and pluralism. This institution has enabled a large group of intellectuals in Chile, especially in the field of social sciences, an area for creating and disseminating knowledge on the political, economic, social and cultural of Chile under the Pinochet's military dictatorship.

The Academy of Christian Humanism University was founded in 1988 as a university within the framework of human values from various strands of social thought, with a decisive role in the formation of new generations of professionals in Chile. This has been setting up work areas, which integrates the teaching, research, extension and interdisciplinary studies of the phenomena characteristic of contemporary society.

This University has been defined as university of academic excellence, that definition is supported by the high quality of its teachers and researchers, and as an open space for discussion and reflection. This position is reflected in the promotion of critical thinking and divergent, through constructive dialogue.

This University acquires full autonomy in 1999, awarded by the Higher Education Council of Chile, consolidating a secular and pluralistic university, consistent with the values of humanism that gave origin.

Colleges and undergraduate programs 

 College of Anthropology
 Anthropology
 College of Dance
 Dance
 College of Education
 Pedagogy of Primary education
 Pedagogy of Special education
 Pedagogy of Preschool education
 Pedagogy of History
 Pedagogy of Spanish language and Communication
 Pedagogy of Mathematics education
 College of Government and Management
 Public Administration
 College of History and Geography
 Geography
 History
 College of Journalism
 Journalism
 College of Law
 Law
 College of Music
 Pedagogy of Music education
 Music production
 College of Political Science and International Relations
 Political Science
 College of Psychology
 Psychology
 College of Social Work
 Social Work
 College of Sociology
 Sociology
 College of Theatre
 Theatre

External links 
 Official Website (in Spanish)
 Study Abroad in Academy of Christian Humanism  University - Courses for foreign students (in English)

Educational institutions established in 1975
Universities in Chile
Private universities in Chile
Academ
1975 establishments in Chile